Heolleung-ro is a road located in Gyeonggi Province and Seoul, South Korea.

Stopovers
 Seoul
 Seocho District - Gangnam District - Songpa District
 Gyeonggi Province
 Goyang

List of Facilities 
IS: Intersection, IC: Interchange

References

Roads in Seoul
Roads in Gyeonggi